Alexander Rusakov (born December 31, 1980) is a Russian trampoline gymnast who made his Olympic debut at the 2004 Summer Olympics, finishing in fifth place in the men's individual competition. He also competed at the 2008 Summer Olympics.

References

External links
 

1980 births
Living people
Russian male trampolinists
Olympic gymnasts of Russia
Gymnasts at the 2004 Summer Olympics
Gymnasts at the 2008 Summer Olympics
Competitors at the 2009 World Games
Medalists at the Trampoline Gymnastics World Championships
21st-century Russian people